Ploioderma is a genus of fungi within the Rhytismataceae family. The genus contains five species.

References

External links
Ploioderma at Index Fungorum

Leotiomycetes